USS Impetuous (PYc-46) was a private yacht purchased by the Navy in August 1940 that served as a patrol boat of the United States Navy in Central America. The yacht was built as Paragon, the first of at least two Davol yachts to bear the name, in 1915 for Charles J. Davol of Providence, Rhode Island. In 1916 Davol sold the yacht to John Fred Betz, 3d  of Philadelphia who renamed the yacht Sybilla III which served as the Section Patrol yacht USS Sybilla III (SP-104) from May 1917 to December 1918. Sybilla III remained in Betz's ownership until sale in 1935 to R. Livingston Sullivan of Philadelphia who renamed the yacht Arlis. On 12 August 1940 the Navy purchased the yacht placing it in commission as USS PC-454 on 16 October. The vessel was given the name Impetuous and reclassified  PYc-46 on 15 July 1943. The yacht was decommissioned at Philadelphia 31 August 1944 and transferred to the War Shipping Administration for sale.

Yacht Paragon
Paragon was built for Charles J. Davol of Providence, Rhode Island in 1915 by Robert Jacob Inc., City Island, New York City. The yacht was designed by Swasey, Raymond & Page, Boston, somewhat along the lines of the U.S. Navy torpedo destroyers. Davol was president and treasurer of the Davol Rubber Company. He maintained moorings for his yachts near his  North Kingstown, Rhode Island estate "Wildacres" which composed most of Quonset Point. He was a member of seven yacht clubs.

The yacht had two 200 horsepower six cylinder gasoline engines with  bore and  stroke. In keeping with its naval look there was a polished and enameled functional quick firing gun mounted aft.

Yacht Sybilla III 
By December 1916 the yacht had been sold to John Fred Betz, 3d who owned a slightly smaller, yacht named Sybilla II. Paragon was renamed by Betz Sybilla III registered in Philadelphia. The sale had been negotiated by the naval architectural firm Gielow & Orr during a period in which the government was buying yachts for potential wartime use and gentlemen yachtsmen were buying suitable yachts to enroll in the Naval Coast Defense Reserve or turn yachts over to the Naval Coast Patrol on the "free rental" of $1 per month.

Sybilla III was acquired 14 May 1917 under free lease from Betz and commissioned the same day as USS Sybilla III (SP-104) for service in the Section Patrol. The yacht served in the Fourth Naval District for a rental of $1 per month plus cost of restoration after use. On 24 December 1918 the yacht was returned to Betz and name struck from the Naval Vessel Register (NVR).

In the 1932-33 register Sybilla III is shown with a new signal, KNMU, and diesel engines. In the 1935-36 register the vessel is shown as Arlis owned by R. Livingston Sullivan of Philadelphia.

USS Impetuous (PYc-46) 
The Navy acquired Arlis from Sullivan for $70,000 on 12 August 1940, converted the yacht at a cost of $50,000 and commissioned the vessel USS PC-454 on 16 October with assignment to the 15th Naval District. PC-454 arrived in the Canal Zone in mid-November 1940 to patrol the approaches to the Panama Canal. From November 1940 to August 1944 she performed escort and antisubmarine patrol operations off Central America. The patrol vessel was named and reclassified Impetuous (PYc-46) on 15 July 1943. On 31 August 1944, the patrol yacht arrived in Philadelphia and was decommissioned there on 27 September, struck from the Naval Register on 14 October and sold by the War Shipping Administration on 14 June 1945.

Footnotes

References

External links 
 Paragon newly built
 Interior, 1915
 Cockpit & gun, 1915
 
  Naval Historical Center Online Library of Selected Images: USS Sybilla III, USS PC-454 and USS Impetuous (Archived at HyperWar)

1915 ships
Ships built in City Island, Bronx
Individual yachts
World War I patrol vessels of the United States
World War II patrol vessels of the United States